Rachel Klein is a noted American chef.

She has received much praise for her take on global cuisine and Asian inspired dishes. She was named 2006 "Best New Chef of Boston" in Boston Magazine as well as winning One of Esquire Magazine's 20 best new restaurants for OM Restaurant in Harvard Square, Cambridge, Massachusetts.

In December 2018, she opened The Square Kitchen & Bar in Sharon, Massachusetts.

References

External links
https://archive.today/20100924012816/http://bostonchefs.com/restaurant/Aura/chef/rachel-klein/

Year of birth missing (living people)
Living people
Place of birth missing (living people)
American chefs